Torbert Escarpment is an escarpment, 15 nautical miles (28 km) long, marking the west margin of Median Snowfield in the Neptune Range, Pensacola Mountains. Mapped by United States Geological Survey (USGS) from surveys and U.S. Navy air photos, 1956–66. Named by Advisory Committee on Antarctic Names (US-ACAN) after Mount Torbert, the salient feature along its edge.

References

Escarpments of Queen Elizabeth Land